Casa Vasari may refer to one of two residences of the Italian architect, painter and art historian Giorgio Vasari:
Casa Vasari, Arezzo
Casa Vasari, Florence